HMS Bellwort was a  built for the Royal Navy during World War II.

After wartime service she was sold to the Irish Naval Service and renamed  after an ancient Irish goddess of love.

Construction
Bellwort was ordered in July 1939 as part of the Royal Navy's 1939 War Emergency building programme. She was laid down by George Brown & Co of Greenock on 17 September 1940, launched 11 August 1941 and completed 20 November the same year. 
After working up and trials she was assigned anti-submarine warfare and convoy escort duties on the West Africa station, based at Freetown.

Service history
From March 1942 onwards Bellwort served with close escort groups on South Atlantic convoys, stationed at Freetown. In three years Bellwort sailed with 42 trade convoys (outbound and homebound), contributing to the safe and timely arrival of more than 800 merchant ships. She was involved in one major convoy battle, around convoy TS 37 in April 1943, which saw the loss of seven ships in one night. 
With the end of hostilities Bellwort was decommissioned and in 1946 she was sold.

Post-war service

Bellwort was one of three Flowers sold to Ireland in 1946. She was handed over to the Irish Naval Service on 3 February 1947 and commissioned Cliona by Lieutenant Walter J. Ready the same day.

She was sold to Haulbowline Industries for scrap on 4 November 1970.

Notes

References
Gardiner R, Chesnau R: Conway's All the World's Fighting Ships 1922–1946 (1980) 
 Elliott, P : Allied Escort Ships of World War II  (1977)

External links
Uboat.net Bellwort

Flower-class corvettes of the Royal Navy
1941 ships